"Good Stuff" is a song by American singer Kelis from her debut studio album, Kaleidoscope (1999). Written and produced by the Neptunes, the song features guest vocals from American rapper Pusha T (then known as Terrar), one half of the hip hop duo Clipse. "Good Stuff" was released as the second single from Kaleidoscope outside the United States on June 5, 2000, by Virgin Records. It managed to achieve moderate success in select European markets, but nevertheless earned Kelis a second top-20 entry on the UK Singles Chart, peaking at number 19.

Track listings
 UK CD 1
 "Good Stuff" (Album Version) – 3:52
 "Good Stuff" (Forces of Nature Radio Edit Mix) – 3:23
 "Good Stuff" (Junior's Transatlantic Mix) – 11:02
 "Good Stuff" (video) – 4:22

 UK CD 2
 "Good Stuff" (UK Radio Edit) – 3:17
 "Good Stuff" (Forces of Nature Sunami Vocal Mix) – 6:07
 "Good Stuff" (Junior's Radio Edit) – 4:42

 Cassette single
 "Good Stuff" (UK Radio Edit) – 3:17
 "Good Stuff" (Forces of Nature Radio Edit Mix) – 3:23
 "Good Stuff" (Junior's Radio Edit) – 4:42

Charts

Weekly charts

Year-end charts

Release history

References

External links
 

2000 singles
2000 songs
Kelis songs
Music videos directed by David LaChapelle
Pusha T songs
Song recordings produced by the Neptunes
Songs written by Chad Hugo
Songs written by Pharrell Williams
Virgin Records singles